Sri Lankan Tamil cinema, the Tamil language film industry in Sri Lanka, has remained relatively small with fewer than 100 films produced. The Tamil film industry in Sri Lanka is not as developed as Sinhala cinema or its Indian counterpart, the Tamil cinema of Kodambakkam, Chennai, Tamil Nadu. There is much competition from Tamil films from Tamil Nadu, India as well as obstacles from the long running ethnic civil war in Sri Lanka.

Tamils contributed significantly to Sinhala cinema as well as Indian Tamil cinema. Only a few Tamil language films were produced in the Northern Province of Sri Lanka. Earlier Tamil movies produced were all most destroyed or unrecovered due to civil war. A Sinhalese film was dubbed in Tamil on 29 December 1951.  The movie Samuthayam (Society), an adaptation of C.N. Annadurai’s Velaikkari was made in 16 mm and technicolor. It was shown in 1962 and 1963. Thottakkari (Plantation Woman), released on 28 March 1962, was the first Sri Lankan Tamil film in the standard 35 mm format. It included speeches by trade unionists S. Thondaman and Azeez and was directed by Krishnakumar who also played the film's male lead.

As a rebirth of Sri Lankan Tamil cinema a comedy / thriller movie ‘'Komaali Kings’' was announced on 23 January 2016. The team says "‘Komaali Kings’ is an attempt to rekindle and re-establish nostalgic memories of the hay days of Sri Lankan Tamil Cinema".

See also
 Sinhala Cinema
 List of Sri Lankan Tamil films
 Sri Lankan Tamils in Sinhala Cinema
 Sri Lankan Tamils in Indian cinema
 Tamil cinema
 South Asian cinema
 Cinema of the world

References

Cinema of Sri Lanka
Sri Lankan Tamil culture
Tamil cinema